Municipal elections were held in the city of Montreal, Quebec, Canada on November 5, 2017 as part of the 2017 Quebec municipal elections. Voters elected 65 positions on the Montreal City Council, including the mayor, borough mayors, and city councillors, as well as 38 borough councillors.

Results

Despite early polls giving incumbent mayor Denis Coderre a comfortable lead, the election concluded with Valérie Plante of Projet Montréal winning the mayoralty race by a margin of over 27,000 votes, becoming the first woman and first representative of Projet Montréal to be elected mayor of Montreal. Her party won a majority of the city council, 34 of 65 councillors.

Projet Montréal won unanimous control of four borough councils and majorities on seven more. Équipe Denis Coderre pour Montréal won unanimous control of four borough councils and majorities on two more. The two remaining boroughs, Anjou and LaSalle, were won unanimously by local parties, Équipe Anjou and Équipe Barbe Team respectively.

Several key city council figures were defeated, such as Russell Copeman, Harout Chitilian, Claude Dauphin, Anie Samson, Réal Ménard and Elsie Lefebvre. Projet Montréal founder Richard Bergeron, who had crossed the floor to Équipe Coderre, was defeated by the candidate for his former party, Robert Beaudry.

Following his defeat, Denis Coderre announced he would resign from political life, leaving his city council seat to his co-candidate Chantal Rossi. On November 9, members of his party elected Darlington councillor Lionel Perez as leader; it was also announced that the party, named for Coderre, would change name in the coming weeks.

Coalition Montréal was left with only one remaining elected official, Montreal's longest-serving city councillor Marvin Rotrand. Vrai changement pour Montréal, which had come in second in the mayoralty race in the previous election, lost all its seats, and announced it would suspend its activities.

For the first time, a majority of Montreal's elected officials (53 out of 103) were women. Six of the 103 elected officials (5.8%), including four of the 65 members of the city council, declared themselves to be members of visible minorities. Visible minorities make up a third of the population of the city. Another elected official, Champlain–L'Île-des-Soeurs city councillor Marie-Josée Parent, who is of Mi'kmaq ancestry, became the first indigenous person elected to Montreal city council.

The official results were released on November 8, 2017. There was one request for a recount, in the race for borough councillor for La Pointe-des-Prairies in Rivière-des-Prairies–Pointe-aux-Trembles, in which Lisa Christensen of Projet Montréal had been announced as the winner with a lead of 32 votes. The recount was conducted by a judge of the Court of Quebec and Ms. Christensen was confirmed as the winner by a majority of 30 votes.

Composition of city and borough councils

Depending on their borough, Montrealers voted for:
 
 Mayor of Montreal
 Borough mayor (except in Ville-Marie, whose mayor is the Mayor of Montreal), who is also a city councillor
 A city councillor for the whole borough (Anjou and Lachine only) or for each district, who is also a borough councillor (Outremont and L'Île-Bizard–Sainte-Geneviève have no city councillors other than the borough mayor)
 Zero, one, or two additional borough councillors for each district

Timeline

2014
May 5 - Borough councillors Lucie Cardyn and Jacqueline Gremaud leave Équipe conservons Outremont to sit as independents.
May 25 - Death of Marcel Côté, leader of Coalition Montréal.
June 16 - Borough mayor Benoit Dorais becomes leader of Coalition Montréal. 
September 5 - Resignation of Mélanie Joly as leader of Vrai changement pour Montréal, replaced by city councillor Lorraine Pagé
October 27 - Resignation of Richard Bergeron as leader of Projet Montréal, replaced by borough mayor Luc Ferrandez
November 18 - City councillor Richard Bergeron leaves Projet Montréal to sit as independent.
December 12 - Resignation of Lucie Cardyn as borough councillor of Robert-Bourassa

2015
March 17 - City councillor Steve Shanahan announces his candidacy for Conservative Party of Canada in Ville-Marie—Le Sud-Ouest—Île-des-Sœurs and is expelled from Vrai changement pour Montréal.
March 22 - In a by-election, Marie Potvin (Équipe Denis Coderre pour Montréal) is elected borough councillor of Robert-Bourassa with 37% of the vote.
June 15 - Borough councillors Michelle Di Genova Zammit (Équipe Anjou) and Éric Dugas (Équipe Richard Bélanger) leave their parties to join Équipe Denis Coderre pour Montréal.
June 23 - Death of Domenico Moschella, city councillor of Saint-Léonard-Est.
August 6 - City councillor Marc-André Gadoury leaves Projet Montréal to join Équipe Denis Coderre pour Montréal.
September 8 - City councillor Érika Duchesne leaves Projet Montréal to sit as independent.
September 16 - City councillor Jean-François Cloutier leaves Équipe Dauphin Lachine to sit as independent.
November 15 - In a by-election, Patricia Lattanzio (Équipe Denis Coderre pour Montréal) is elected city councillor of Saint-Léonard-Est with 83.7% of the vote.
December 16 - City councillor Lorraine Pagé leaves Vrai changement pour Montréal to sit as independent.
December 22 - City councillor Justine McIntyre becomes leader of Vrai changement pour Montréal.

2016
January 7 - Resignation of Gilles Deguire as borough mayor of Montréal-Nord, replaced by city councillor Chantal Rossi
January 18 - City councillor Steve Shanahan (independent) rejoins Vrai changement pour Montréal.
March 17 - City councillor Érika Duchesne (independent) joins Équipe Denis Coderre pour Montréal.
April 24 - In a by-election, Christine Black (Équipe Denis Coderre pour Montréal) is elected borough mayor of Montréal-Nord with 68.6% of the vote.
November 4 - Borough mayor Russell Copeman leaves Coalition Montréal to join Équipe Denis Coderre pour Montréal.
November 6 - City councillor Richard Bergeron (independent) joins Équipe Denis Coderre pour Montréal.
November 28 - Borough councillor Maja Vodanovic leaves Équipe Dauphin Lachine to sit as independent.
December 4 - City councillor Valérie Plante is elected leader of Projet Montréal with 51.9% of the vote.
December 26 - Borough mayor Benoit Dorais leaves Coalition Montréal to sit as independent.
December 29 - City councillor Marvin Rotrand becomes interim leader of Coalition Montréal.

2017
January 23 - Borough councillor Maja Vodanovic (independent) joins Projet Montréal.
March 29 - Borough mayor Réal Ménard leaves Coalition Montréal to join Équipe Denis Coderre pour Montréal.
May 29 - City councillors Lorraine Pagé (independent) and Jean-François Cloutier (independent) and borough councillor Kimberley Simonyik (Équipe Dauphin Lachine) join Équipe Denis Coderre pour Montréal.
May 31 - Borough mayor Benoit Dorais (independent) joins Projet Montréal.
June 11 - City councillor Elsie Lefebvre leaves Coalition Montréal to sit as independent.
June 28 - Borough mayor Normand Marinacci and borough councillors Christian Larocque and Jean-Dominic Lévesque-René leave Vrai changement pour Montréal to join Projet Montréal.
August 23 - City councillor Elsie Lefebvre (independent) joins Équipe Denis Coderre pour Montréal.
September 20 - Borough councillor Gilles Beaudry leaves Équipe Anjou to sit as independent.
September 22 - Official beginning of the electoral campaign
October 17 - Jean Fortier, mayoral candidate for Coalition Montréal, announces that he is abandoning his campaign for mayor of Montreal. However, his name will remain on the ballot. He endorses Valérie Plante of Projet Montréal for mayor.
October 19 - French mayoral debate opposing Denis Coderre and Valérie Plante
October 23 - English mayoral debate opposing Denis Coderre and Valérie Plante
October 29 - Advance poll with a turnout of 6.54% of the registered electors

Incumbent mayors and councillors who did not run for re-election
Équipe Denis Coderre pour Montréal
 Maurice Cohen, borough councillor, Côte-de-Liesse, Saint-Laurent
 Pierre Desrochers, city councillor, Saint-Sulpice, Ahuntsic-Cartierville
 Pierre Gagnier, borough mayor, Ahuntsic-Cartierville
 Manon Gauthier, city councillor, Champlain–L'Île-des-Sœurs, Verdun
 Jean-Marc Gibeau, city councillor, Ovide-Clermont, Montréal-Nord
 Sylvia Lo Bianco, borough councillor, Ovide-Clermont, Montréal-Nord
 Monica Ricourt, borough councillor, Marie-Clarac, Montréal-Nord

Projet Montréal
 Guillaume Lavoie, city councillor, Marie-Victorin, Rosemont–La Petite-Patrie
 Jean-Dominic Lévesque-René, borough councillor, Jacques-Bizard, L'Île-Bizard–Sainte-Geneviève
 Louise Mainville, city councillor, De Lorimier, Le Plateau Mont-Royal

Équipe Anjou
 Paul-Yvon Perron, borough councillor, East district, Anjou

Independent
 Marie Cinq-Mars, borough mayor, Outremont

Opinion polls

Seat-by-seat results

Mayoral race

Although Jean Fortier of Coalition Montréal abandoned his campaign for mayor on October 17, 2017 and endorsed Valérie Plante, his name officially remained on the ballot.

Ahuntsic-Cartierville

Anjou

Côte-des-Neiges–Notre-Dame-de-Grâce

L'Île-Bizard–Sainte-Geneviève

Lachine

LaSalle

Mercier–Hochelaga-Maisonneuve

Montréal-Nord

Outremont

Pierrefonds-Roxboro

Le Plateau-Mont-Royal

Rivière-des-Prairies–Pointe-aux-Trembles

Rosemont–La Petite-Patrie

Saint-Laurent

Saint-Léonard

Le Sud-Ouest

Verdun

Ville-Marie

Villeray–Saint-Michel–Parc-Extension

By-elections

Mayor of Rivière-des-Prairies–Pointe-aux-Trembles
By-elections were held on December 16, 2018:

Councillor, Saint-Michel District
By-elections were held on December 16, 2018:

Mayor of Le Plateau-Mont-Royal
A by-election was held on October 6, 2019:

References

Municipal elections in Montreal
2017 Quebec municipal elections
2010s in Montreal
2017 in Quebec